Pedro Henrique dos Santos Neschling (born 28 June 1982) is a Brazilian actor, director and writer.

Personal life
Neschling is the son of John Neschling, composer and conductor, and of Lucélia Santos, actress and director. He has Jewish roots on his paternal side.

His first television role was in a TV series Sítio do Picapau Amarelo in 2003.

Filmography

Television

Film

Theater

References

External links

Official website

1982 births
Living people
Male actors from Rio de Janeiro (city)
Brazilian people of Austrian-Jewish descent
Brazilian male television actors
Brazilian male writers
Brazilian film directors
Writers from Rio de Janeiro (city)
Brazilian emigrants to Portugal
Authors of Brazilian telenovelas